NBC 33 may refer to one of the following television stations in the United States:

Current
 WNBD-LD in Grenada, Mississippi
 WVLA-TV in Baton Rouge, Louisiana

Former
 KKTU (now KQCK) in Cheyenne, Wyoming (1987 to 2003)
 WEEU-TV in Reading, Pennsylvania (1953 to 1956)
 WKJG-TV/WISE-TV in Fort Wayne, Indiana (1953 to 2016)